Dahanu Road is a railway station near the town of Dahanu in Palghar district of Maharashtra. It lies on the Western line of the Mumbai Suburban Railway network. It is the northern limit of the Suburban network, although the track continues north to Gholvad and beyond.

History
The railway was extended as a double track from Palghar to Dahanu Road on 17 January 1898 and continued as single track up to Gholvad on 18 October 1900. On 16 April 2013 Western Railway started services for Dahanu Road station i.e. Churchgate–Dahanu Local Train (EMU)

In 2002 Western Railway announced that it would extend the EMU service from Virar up to Dahanu Road. On 16 April 2013 Western Railway Started Services For Dahanu Road to Churchgate Using EMU Trains. In January 2012 the Vasai and Virar Municipal Corporation started litigation to force the railway to run direct services from Mumbai Churchgate to Dahanu Road, rather than making passengers change at Virar as at present. The railway replied that they did not have enough trains for through services and the tracks north of Virar were already too busy. In March 2012, Railway Minister Dinesh Trivedi announced additional services on the Virar-Dahanu Road railway.

Gallery

Major trains

The following trains stop at Dahanu Road railway station:

 Bandra Terminus–Dehradun Express
 Bandra Terminus–Jamnagar Saurashtra Janta Express
 Saurashtra Express
 Firozpur Janata Express
 Lok Shakti Express
 Gujarat Mail
 Flying Ranee
 Gujarat Superfast Express
 Ahimsa Express
 Bhagat Ki Kothi–Pune Express
 Veraval–Pune Express
 Amrapur Aravali Express
 Thiruvananthapuram–Hazrat Nizamuddin Express (via Alappuzha)
 Thiruvananthapuram–Hazrat Nizamuddin Express (via Kottayam)
 Bandra Terminus – Bhavnagar Terminus Weekly Superfast Express
 Sayajinagari Express
 Paschim Express

Notes and references

Transport in Palghar
Railway stations in India opened in 1898
Mumbai WR railway division
Railway stations in Palghar district
Mumbai Suburban Railway stations